Jack Thomas Stallings (April 8, 1931 – June 19, 2018) was an American college baseball head coach. He was the head coach of Wake Forest University, Florida State University, and Georgia Southern University. He also helped manage the United States national baseball team in 1970 and 1973 and was an administrator for the 1984 US Olympic Team and the 1988 US Olympic Team. With over 1,200 games won as a head coach, he ranks 28th all-time with the most wins by any Division I coach, with his 859–582–5 tenure at Georgia Southern being a record for most wins and games coached. His #1 jersey is retired by the program.

At Georgia Southern, he was named the TAAC Coach of the Year four times and Southern Conference Baseball Coach of the Year twice.

He died on June 19, 2018, at the age of 87.

Head coaching record

Awards
American Baseball Coaches Association Hall of Fame

See also
List of college baseball coaches with 1,100 wins

Notes

References

1931 births
2018 deaths
Wake Forest Demon Deacons baseball players
Roanoke Ro-Sox players
Greensboro Patriots players
Bluefield Blue-Grays players
Wake Forest Demon Deacons baseball coaches
North Carolina Tar Heels baseball coaches
High school baseball coaches in the United States
Florida State Seminoles baseball coaches
Georgia Southern Eagles baseball coaches
Pan American Games medalists in baseball
Pan American Games silver medalists for the United States
Baseball players at the 1951 Pan American Games
Medalists at the 1951 Pan American Games
Sportspeople from Durham, North Carolina